The following are the national records in speed skating in Belgium maintained by the Koninklijke Belgische Snelschaatsfederatie (KBSF).

Men

Women

References

External links
 KBSF web site
 Belgian records

National records in speed skating
Speed skating-related lists
Speed skating
Records
Speed skating